Abu'l-Qásim Faizi or Fayḍí (1906–1980) was a Persian Baháʼí. He studied at the American University of Beirut where he was good friends with Munib Shahid.

He married Gloria ʻAláʼí in 1939. Together they pioneered to Iraq and Bahrain. Shoghi Effendi called him the 'sprititual conqueror' of Arabia, and appointed him Hand of the Cause of God in 1957.

In 1960, when the National Spiritual Assembly of France accepted Mason Remey's claim to be the Guardian after the death of Shoghi Effendi, the Custodians (who were the nine Hands of the Cause of God assigned specifically to work at the Baháʼí World Centre) sent Abu'l-Qásim Faizi to meet with them.  Through his reports, the Hands of the Cause disbanded the Assembly, declaring its members Covenant-breakers.

Bibliography

Biography: "Faizi" published by George Ronald - also available on Amazon

References

External links
Author introduced Faith to a generation, about the passing of Gloria Faizi.
, talking about the Ridván Garden near 'Akká

Iranian Bahá'ís
Hands of the Cause
1906 births
1980 deaths
Sindhi people
20th-century Bahá'ís